The Chemical Biological Incident Response Force (CBIRF) is a Marine Corps Special Operations Capable Forces unit responsible for countering the effects of a chemical, biological, radiological, nuclear, or high-yield explosive (CBRNE) incident, support counter CBRN terrorism, and urban search and rescue when CBRN incident. They were activated in April 1996 by General Charles C. Krulak, then Commandant of the Marine Corps. The unit is based at Naval Support Facility Indian Head in Indian Head, Maryland and falls under the command of the United States Marine Corps Forces Command.

Mission
When directed, a CBIRF unit will forward-deploy and/or respond to a credible threat of a chemical, biological, radiological, nuclear, or high-yield explosive (CBRNE) incident in order to assist local, state, or federal agencies and Unified Combat Commanders in the conduct of consequence management operations.

CBIRF accomplishes this mission by providing capabilities for CBRN agent detection and identification, casualty search and extraction, technical rescue, personnel decontamination, and tactical emergency medical care and stabilization of contaminated victims. All CBIRF Marines and sailors are trained to perform both casualty extraction and decontamination. The lifesaving competencies required of personnel serving at CBIRF are taught during CBIRF Basic Operations Course (CBOC). By completing CBOC, all Marines and Sailors are able to support CBIRF's mission, and bolster the current response force.

History
Since its inception CBIRF has trained many local agencies. It has also had a presence at the following:

 1996 Summer Olympic Games 
 1997 Presidential Inaugural Ceremony
 1997 Denver Summit of the Eight
 1997-2020 Presidential State of the Union Addresses
 1999 Pope Visit to St Louis, MO
 1999 NATO Summit
 2001 Presidential Inaugural Ceremony
 2001 Cleaned Anthrax out of the Longworth House Office Bldg in Washington, DC
 2001 Cleaned Anthrax out of the Hart Senate Bldg in Washington DC
 2004 Ricin Incident Attack on Dirksen Senate Building
 2004 Dedication of World War II Memorial
 2004 Lying In State of President Ronald W. Reagan
 2005 Presidential Inaugural Ceremony
 2008 Republican National Convention in St. Paul, MN
 2009 Presidential Inaugural Ceremony
 2011 Operation Tomodachi
 2012 NATO Summit
 2013 Presidential Inaugural Ceremony
 2016 State of the Union Address
 2016 Republican and Democratic National Conventions
 2017 Presidential Inaugural Ceremony
 2018 State of the Union Address
 2019 State of the Union Address
 2020 State of the Union Address
 2020 Republican and Democratic National Conventions
 2021 Presidential Inaugural Ceremony
 2021 Presidential Address to Congress

Awards

See also

References

External links

 CBIRF's official website

Military units and formations of the United States Marine Corps
1996 establishments in Maryland